This is a list of the justices of the Supreme Court of Georgia, the highest judicial authority of the U.S. state of Georgia:

Chief justices

Associate justices

References

Chief Justices and Justices, 1845-Present

 
 
Georgia
Justices